The Lego Movie is a 2014 computer-animated adventure comedy film co-produced by Warner Animation Group, Village Roadshow Pictures, Lego System A/S, Vertigo Entertainment, and Lin Pictures, and distributed by Warner Bros. Pictures. It was written and directed by Phil Lord and Christopher Miller from a story they co-wrote with Dan and Kevin Hageman, based on the Lego line of construction toys. The film stars the voices of Chris Pratt, Will Ferrell, Elizabeth Banks, Will Arnett, Nick Offerman, Alison Brie, Charlie Day, Liam Neeson, and Morgan Freeman. A collaboration between production houses from the United States, Australia, and Denmark, its story focuses on Emmet Brickowski (Pratt), an ordinary Lego minifigure who helps a resistance movement stop a tyrannical businessman (Ferrell) from gluing everything in the Lego world into his vision of perfection.

Plans of a feature film based on Lego started in 2008 following a discussion between producers Dan Lin and Roy Lee, before Lin left Warner Bros. to form his own production company, Lin Pictures. By August 2009, it was announced that Dan and Kevin Hageman had begun writing the script. It was officially green-lit by Warner Bros. in November 2011 with a planned 2014 release date. Chris McKay was brought in to co-direct in 2011 with Lord and Miller, and later became the film's animation supervisor. The film was strongly inspired by the visual aesthetic and stylistics of Brickfilms and qualities attributed to Lego Studios sets. While Lord and Miller wanted to make the film's animation replicate a stop motion film, everything was done through computer graphics, with the animation rigs following the same articulation limits actual Lego figures have. Much of the cast signed on to voice the characters in 2012, including Pratt, Ferrell, Banks, Arnett, Freeman, and Brie, while the animation was provided by Animal Logic, which was expected to comprise 80% of the film. The film was dedicated to Kathleen Fleming, the former director of entertainment development of the Lego company, following her death in Cancún, Mexico, in April 2013.

The Lego Movie premiered in Los Angeles on February 1, 2014, and was released in the United States on February 7. It became a critical and commercial success, grossing $468.1 million worldwide against its $60–65 million budget, and receiving critical acclaim for its animation, story, humor, and acting. The National Board of Review selected The Lego Movie as one of the top films of the year. Although it did not receive an Academy Award nomination for Best Animated Feature, it garnered numerous other accolades including Producers Guild of America Award for Best Animated Motion Picture and a nomination for Best Original Song at the 87th Academy Awards.

The Lego Movie is the first entry in what would become the franchise of the same name, which includes three more films—The Lego Batman Movie (2017), The Lego Ninjago Movie (2017), and The Lego Movie 2: The Second Part (2019).

Plot

In the Lego universe, the wizard Vitruvius is blinded when he fails to protect a superweapon called the "Kragle", a tube of Krazy Glue with the label partially scratched, from the evil Lord Business, but prophesies that a person called "The Special" will find the Piece of Resistance capable of stopping the Kragle. Lord Business claims it false and kicks Vitruvius off a cliff.

Eight and a half years later, in Bricksburg, construction worker Emmet Brickowski comes across a beautiful woman searching for something at his construction site. Emmet falls into a pit and finds the Piece of Resistance. Compelled to touch it, Emmet experiences visions and passes out. He awakens in the custody of Bad Cop, Business's lieutenant, with the Piece of Resistance attached to his back. Emmet learns of Business's plans to freeze the world with the Kragle; the Piece of Resistance is the tube's cap. The woman, nicknamed Wyldstyle, rescues Emmet, believing him to be the Special. They escape Bad Cop and travel to "The Old West" where they meet Vitruvius. He and Wyldstyle are Master Builders, capable of building anything without instruction manuals, who oppose Business's attempts to suppress their creativity. Though disappointed Emmet is not a Master Builder, they are convinced of his potential when he recalls visions of "the Man Upstairs".

Emmet, Wyldstyle, and Vitruvius evade Bad Cop's forces with the help of Wyldstyle's boyfriend, Batman, and escape to "Cloud Cuckoo Land", where all the master builders are in hiding. The Master Builders are unimpressed with Emmet's cowardice and refuse to help him fight Business. Bad Cop's forces attack and capture everyone except Emmet, Wyldstyle, Vitruvius, Batman, and fellow Master Builders MetalBeard, a pirate, Unikitty, a kitten with a unicorn's horn, and Benny, an astronaut. Emmet devises a plan to infiltrate Business's headquarters and disarm the Kragle. The plan almost succeeds until Emmet and his friends are captured and imprisoned. Lord Business decapitates Vitruvius with a penny, and throws the Piece of Resistance into an abyss, and sets his headquarters to self-destruct, leaving all present to die. Vitruvius reveals he made up the prophecy before he dies, but his spirit returns to tell Emmet it is his self-belief that makes him the Special. Strapped to the self-destruct mechanism's battery, Emmet flings himself off the edge in the tower and saves his friends and the Master Builders. Inspired by Emmet's sacrifice, Wyldstyle rallies the Lego people across the universe to use whatever creativity they have to build machines and weapons to fight Business's forces.

Emmet finds himself in the human world where the events of his life are being played out in a basement by a young boy, Finn, on his father's Lego set. The father — "The Man Upstairs" — chastises his son for creating hodgepodges of different playsets and begins to permanently glue his perceived "perfect" creations together. Realizing the danger, Emmet wills himself to move and gains Finn's attention. Finn returns Emmet and the Piece of Resistance to the set, where Emmet possesses the powers of a Master Builder and confronts Business. In the human world, Finn's father looks at his son's creations and sees how he based the villainous Business on him. Through a speech by Emmet, Finn tells his father that he is very special and has the power to change everything. Finn's father reconciles with his son, which plays out as Business reforming, capping the Kragle with the Piece of Resistance, and ungluing his victims with mineral spirits as Wyldstyle and Emmet enter a relationship, with Batman's blessing. As Finn's younger sister joins in playing with the Lego sets, Duplo aliens arrive in the Lego universe and threaten destruction.

Cast

 Chris Pratt as Emmet Brickowski, an everyman and construction worker from Bricksburg who is initially mistaken for the Special.
 Will Ferrell as Lord Business, an evil businessman who hates Master Builders, tyrant of Bricksburg and the Lego Universe who is the company president of the Octan Corporation under the name President Business. 
 Ferrell also plays "The Man Upstairs", a Lego collector and Finn's father in the live-action part of the film.
 Morgan Freeman as Vitruvius, a blind and elderly wizard-like Master Builder.
 Elizabeth Banks as Lucy / Wyldstyle, a "tough as nails" and tech-savvy Master Builder.
 Will Arnett as Bruce Wayne / Batman, a DC Comics character who is one of the Master Builders, as well as Wyldstyle's boyfriend and an amateur musician.
 Nick Offerman as MetalBeard, a pirate-like Master Builder seeking revenge on Lord Business for taking his body parts following an earlier encounter and causing him to remake his body from bricks.
 Alison Brie as Princess Unikitty, a unicorn/cat hybrid-like Master Builder who lives in Cloud Cuckoo Land.
 Charlie Day as Benny, a "1980-something space guy"-like Master Builder who is obsessed with building spaceships.
 Liam Neeson as Bad Cop / Good Cop / Scribble Cop, a police officer with a two-sided head and a split personality who serves Lord Business as the commander of the Super Secret Police. The character's name and personality are based on the good cop/bad cop interrogation method, which is briefly shown in the film.
 Neeson also voices Pa Cop, a police officer who is Bad Cop/Good Cop's father and Ma Cop's husband.
 Channing Tatum as Superman, a DC Comics character who is one of the Master Builders
 Jonah Hill as Green Lantern, a DC Comics character who is one of the Master Builders
 Cobie Smulders as Wonder Woman, a DC Comics character who is one of the Master Builders.
 Jadon Sand as Finn, an eight-and-a-half-year-old boy who is the son of "The Man Upstairs" in the live-action part of the film.

Additionally, Anthony Daniels, Keith Ferguson, and Billy Dee Williams appear as protocol droid C-3PO, and smugglers Han Solo and Lando Calrissian from the Star Wars franchise and the television series Robot Chicken. Other appearances from licensed Lego iterations of franchises include Gandalf from the Lord of the Rings and the Hobbit franchises (voiced by Todd Hansen); Dumbledore from the Wizarding World franchise; The Flash and Aquaman from DC Comics; Milhouse from The Simpsons; Michelangelo from the Teenage Mutant Ninja Turtles franchise and Speed Racer from the Lego tie-in sets released alongside the 2008 film adaptation of the eponymous animated television series.

Shaquille O'Neal portrays a Lego version of himself who is a Master Builder alongside two generic members of the 2002 NBA All-Stars. Will Forte (credited as Orville Forte) portrays Abraham Lincoln (whom he had previously voiced on Clone High, another Lord/Miller production). Dave Franco, Jake Johnson and Keegan-Michael Key portray Emmet's co-workers Wally, Barry and Foreman Jim respectively. Director Christopher Miller voices as a TV announcer for the Octan comedy show Where Are My Pants?; his son Graham Miller voices the Duplo alien.

Production

Development
The development of The Lego Movie began in 2008, when Dan Lin and Roy Lee discussed it before Lin left Warner Bros. Pictures to form his own production company, Lin Pictures. Warner Bros. home entertainment executive Kevin Tsujihara, who had recognized the value of the Lego franchise by engineering the studio's purchase of Lego video game licensee Traveller's Tales in 2007, thought the success of the Lego-based video games indicated a Lego-based film was a good idea, and reportedly "championed" the development of the film.

By August 2009, Dan and Kevin Hageman were writing the script described as "action adventure set in a Lego world." In 2008, Lin visited The Lego Group's headquarters in Denmark to pitch his vision for the film, later remarking uncertainty among executives. “They weren’t rude or anything (…) but they didn’t feel they needed a movie. They were already a very successful brand. Why take the risk?" Nevertheless, Lego's vice president of licensing and entertainment Jill Wilfert responded positively to the Hagemans' treatment that Lin pitched. “Once we heard the pitch, how Dan felt he could bring the values of the brand to life, we started to think, ‘This could be interesting.'"

Cloudy with a Chance of Meatballs (2009) directors Phil Lord and Christopher Miller were in talks in June 2010 to write and direct the film. Warner Bros. green-lit the film by November 2011, with a planned 2014 release date. The Australian studio Animal Logic, the same studio that did the animation for other Warner Bros. films such as Happy Feet and Legend of the Guardians: The Owls of Ga'Hoole, was contracted to provide the animation, which was expected to comprise 80% of the film. By this time Chris McKay, the director of Robot Chicken, had also joined Lord and Miller to co-direct. McKay explained that his role was to supervise the production in Australia once Lord and Miller left to work on 22 Jump Street (2014). In March 2012, Lord and Miller revealed the film's working title, Lego: The Piece of Resistance, and a storyline.

Casting
By June 2012, Chris Pratt had been cast as the voice of Emmet, the lead Lego character, and Will Arnett voicing a Lego version of Batman; the role of Lego Superman was offered to Channing Tatum. By August 2012, Elizabeth Banks was hired to voice Lucy (later getting the alias "Wyldstyle") and Morgan Freeman to voice Vitruvius, an old mystic. In November 2012, Alison Brie, Will Ferrell, Liam Neeson, and Nick Offerman signed on for roles. Brie voices Unikitty, a member of Emmet's team: Ferrell voices the antagonist President/Lord Business; Neeson voices Bad Cop/Good Cop: and Offerman voices MetalBeard, a pirate seeking revenge on Business.

Warner Bros. already owns the film rights to intellectual properties from which key characters appear in the film (i.e. DC Comics; Wizarding World), but the filmmakers still ran their depictions by other creatives; this included Christopher Nolan and Zack Snyder, who were directing The Dark Knight Rises (2012) and Man of Steel (2013) at the time of the film's production, as well as Harry Potter creator J.K. Rowling. Lord recalled that Superman was omitted for an extended period of time due to a lawsuit against Warner Bros. by the heirs of co-creator Jerry Siegel, before being reinserted at the last minute. The film also features Keith Ferguson, Billy Dee Williams and Anthony Daniels reprising their roles as Lego iterations of Star Wars characters Han Solo, Lando Calrissian and C-3PO respectively. Lin recalled the closure of their deal to feature the characters as hectic, as The Walt Disney Company announced their purchase of Lucasfilm a few weeks after the filmmakers had traveled there and received permission to include them.

Animation process

The Lego Movie was strongly inspired by the visual aesthetic and stylistics of Brickfilms and qualities attributed to Lego Studios sets. The film received a great deal of praise in the respective online communities from filmmakers and fans, who saw the film as appraising nod to their work. In the film's live-action segment, Finn returns Emmet to the Lego world via an arts-and-crafts-covered tube labeled "Magic Portal," which production designer Grant Freckleton confirmed was a direct reference to Australian filmmaker Lindsay Fleay's 1989 animated short film The Magic Portal, which similarly incorporated live-action segments. Fleay went on to work at Animal Logic, though he left before production on The Lego Movie began.

Animal Logic tried to make the film's animation replicate a stop motion film although everything was done through computer graphics, with the animation rigs following the same articulation limits actual Lego figures have. The camera systems also tried to replicate live action cinematography, including different lenses and a Steadicam simulator. The scenery was projected through The Lego Group's own Lego Digital Designer (created as part of Lego Design byME, which people could design their own Lego models using LDD, then upload them to the Lego website, design their own box design, and order them for actual delivery), which as CG supervisor Aidan Sarsfield detailed, "uses the official LEGO Brick Library and effectively simulates the connectivity of each of the bricks."

The saved files were then converted to design and animate in Maya and XSI. At times the minifigures were even placed under microscopes to capture the seam lines, dirt and grime into the digital textures. Benny the spaceman was based on the line of Lego space sets sold in the 1980s, and his design includes the broken helmet chin strap, a common defect of the space sets at that time. Miller's childhood Space Village playset was used in the film.

Post-production
The Lego Movie was the first theatrical feature film produced by Warner Animation Group, and was released over 10 years after the box office failure of Warner Bros. Feature Animation's final film Looney Tunes: Back in Action in 2003. The film's total cost, including production, prints, and advertising (P&A), was $100 million. Half of the film's cost was financed by Village Roadshow Pictures, and was the only film in the franchise that Village Roadshow ever had involvement working on. The rest was covered by Warner Bros., with RatPac-Dune Entertainment providing a smaller share as part of its multi-year financing agreement with Warner Bros. Initially Warner Bros. turned down Village Roadshow Pictures when it asked to invest in the film. However, Warner Bros. later changed its mind, reportedly due to lack of confidence in the film, initially offering Village Roadshow Pictures the opportunity to finance 25% of the film, and later, an additional 25%.

Music

The film's original score was composed by Mark Mothersbaugh, who had previously worked with Lord and Miller on Cloudy with a Chance of Meatballs (2009) and 21 Jump Street (2012). The Lego Movie soundtrack contains the score as the majority of its tracks. Also included is the song "Everything Is Awesome" written by Shawn Patterson, Joshua Bartholomew and Lisa Harriton, who also perform the song under the name Jo Li. The single, released on January 23, 2014, is performed by Tegan and Sara featuring The Lonely Island (Andy Samberg, Akiva Schaffer, and Jorma Taccone) who wrote the rap lyrics, and is played in the film's end credits. The soundtrack was released on February 4, 2014, by WaterTower Music.

Marketing and release
Lego released a number of building toy sets based on scenes from The Lego Movie. The Lego Movie premiered on February 1, 2014, at the Regency Village Theatre in Los Angeles. It was originally scheduled for general release on February 28, but the film was moved up to February 7. The film was released in Australia by Roadshow Films.

Warner Home Video released The Lego Movie for digital download, and on DVD and Blu-ray on June 17, 2014. At the same time, a special Blu-ray 3D "Everything is Awesome Edition" also includes an exclusive Vitruvius minifigure and a collectible 3D Emmet photo. Overall, The Lego Movie was the fourth best-selling film of 2014 with 4.9 million units sold and earning a revenue of $105.2 million.

Reception

Box office
The Lego Movie grossed $257.8 million in the United States and Canada and $210.3 million in other territories, for a worldwide total of $468.1 million. Deadline Hollywood calculated the film's net profit as $229million, accounting for production budgets, marketing, talent participations, and other costs; box office grosses and home media revenues placed it third on their list of 2014's "Most Valuable Blockbusters".

In the United States and Canada, The Lego Movie was released with The Monuments Men and Vampire Academy on February 7, 2014. It earned $17.2 million on its first day, including $425,000 from Thursday night previews. During its opening weekend, the film earned $69.1 million from 3,775 theaters. This made it the second-highest February opening weekend, behind The Passion of the Christ. The Lego Movie attracted a mostly diverse audience, with about 64 percent for Caucasians, Hispanic 16 percent, African-American 12 percent, and Asian 8 percent, as well as 41 percent being under 18 years of age. Its second weekend earnings dropped by 28 percent to $49.8 million, and followed by another $31.3 million the third weekend. The Lego Movie completed its theatrical run in the United States and Canada on September 4, 2014.

Worldwide, The Lego Movie earned $69.1 million in its opening weekend in 34 markets. On its opening weekend elsewhere, the top countries were the United Kingdom ($13.4 million), Australia ($5.7 million), Russia ($3.9 million), Mexico ($3.8 million), and France ($3.1 million). The film had the strongest start for a non-sequel animated film in the United Kingdom ahead of The Simpsons Movie and Up. It would remain as the country's highest opening weekend for a 2014 film until it was surpassed by The Amazing Spider-Man 2 that spring. , its top international markets were the United Kingdom ($57 million), Australia ($20 million), and Germany ($13.1 million).

Critical response
The Lego Movie was met with universal acclaim.  The critical consensus reads, "Boasting beautiful animation, a charming voice cast, laugh-a-minute gags, and a surprisingly thoughtful story, The Lego Movie is colorful fun for all ages."  Audiences polled by CinemaScore gave the film an average grade of "A" on an A+ to F scale.

Michael Rechtshaffen of The Hollywood Reporter wrote, "Arriving at a time when feature animation was looking and feeling mighty anemic...The LEGO Movie shows 'em how it's done", with Peter Debruge of Variety adding that Lord and Miller "irreverently deconstruct the state of the modern blockbuster and deliver a smarter, more satisfying experience in its place, emerging with a fresh franchise for others to build upon". Susan Wloszczyna of RogerEbert.com gave the film four stars out of four, writing, "It still might be a 100-minute commercial, but at least it's a highly entertaining and, most surprisingly, a thoughtful one with in-jokes that snap, crackle and zoom by at warp speed." Tom Huddleston of Time Out said, "The script is witty, the satire surprisingly pointed, and the animation tactile and imaginative." Drew Hunt of the Chicago Reader said the filmmakers "fill the script with delightfully absurd one-liners and sharp pop culture references", with A. O. Scott of The New York Times noting that, "Pop-culture jokes ricochet off the heads of younger viewers to tickle the world-weary adults in the audience, with just enough sentimental goo applied at the end to unite the generations. Parents will dab their eyes while the kids roll theirs."

Claudia Puig of USA Today called the film "a spirited romp through a world that looks distinctively familiar, and yet freshly inventive". Liam Lacey of The Globe and Mail asked, "Can a feature-length toy commercial also work as a decent kids' movie? The bombast of the G.I. Joe and Transformers franchises might suggest no, but after an uninspired year for animated movies, The Lego Movie is a 3-D animated film that connects." Joel Arnold of NPR acknowledged that the film "may be one giant advertisement, but all the way to its plastic-mat foundation, it's an earnest piece of work—a cash grab with a heart". Peter Travers of Rolling Stone called the film "sassy enough to shoot well-aimed darts at corporate branding". Michael O'Sullivan of The Washington Post said that, "While clearly filled with affection for—and marketing tie-ins to—the titular product that's front and center, it's also something of a sharp plastic brick flung in the eye of its corporate sponsor." Moira MacDonald of The Seattle Times, while generally positive, found "it falls apart a bit near the end". Alonso Duralde of The Wrap said the film "will doubtless tickle young fans of the toys. It's just too bad that a movie that encourages you to think for yourself doesn't follow its own advice."

The Lego Movie was included on a number of best-of lists. It was listed on many critics' top ten lists in 2014, ranking fifteenth. Several publications have listed the film as one of the best animated films, including: Insider, USA Today (2018), Rolling Stone (2019), Parade, Time Out New York, and Empire (all 2021). The film was also named by filmmaker Edgar Wright and Time film critic Richard Corliss as one of their favorite films of 2014 and acclaimed actress Tilda Swinton named it her favorite film of 2014.

Other response
Conservative political commentator Glenn Beck praised the film for avoiding "the double meanings and adult humor I just hate". Oscar host Neil Patrick Harris referenced The Lego Movie not being nominated for Best Animated Feature, which many critics considered a snub, saying prior to the award's presentation, "If you're at the Oscar party with the guys who directed 'The Lego Movie,' now would be a great time to distract them."

U.S. Senator Ron Johnson criticized the film's anti-corporate message, saying that it taught children that "government is good and business is bad", citing the villain's name of Lord Business. "That's done for a reason", Johnson told WisPolitics.com, "They're starting that propaganda, and it's insidious". The comments were criticized by many, and Russ Feingold brought up the comments on the campaign trail during his 2016 Senate bid against Johnson.

Accolades

At the 87th Academy Awards, The Lego Movie received a nomination for Best Original Song. The film's other nominations include six Annie Awards (winning one), a British Academy Film Award (which it won), two Critics' Choice Movie Awards (winning one), and a Golden Globe Award. The Lego Movie was selected by the National Board of Review as one of their top choices for the organization's annual top ten films list, while winning Best Animated Film.

Other media
In 2014, an adventure video game, The Lego Movie Videogame, was released for multiple platforms. Lego Dimensions (2015) features characters from several media franchises, including The Lego Movie. The Lego Movie: 4D – A New Adventure is a 4-D film at Legoland Florida, that has been in operation since 2016. Written and directed by Rob Schrab, the 12-minute attraction stars A. J. Locascio as Emmet, with Banks, Brie, Day, and Offerman reprising their respective roles; while Patton Oswalt plays President Business's brother, Risky Business.

Follow-ups

Warner Bros. released two spin-offs in 2017: The Lego Batman Movie and The Lego Ninjago Movie. Both films set in different universes apart from The Lego Movie one. The Lego Batman Movie was considered a success, while The Lego Ninjago Movie was a failure. A television series Unikitty! (2017–2020) focuses on the eponymous character (Tara Strong) and her friends. The Lego Movie was followed by The Lego Movie 2: The Second Part in 2019. Following the financial failures of both The Lego Ninjago Movie and The Lego Movie 2, Universal Pictures set a five-year film deal with The Lego Group.

Notes

References

External links
 
 Official website at Lego.com
 Official Warner Bros. Site
 
 

 
2010s adventure comedy films
2010s American animated films
2010s animated superhero films
2010s English-language films
2014 3D films
2014 animated films
2014 comedy films
2014 computer-animated films
3D animated films
American 3D films
American action comedy films
American adventure comedy films
American animated feature films
American children's animated comic science fiction films
American children's animated science fantasy films
American computer-animated films
American dystopian films
American fantasy adventure films
American films with live action and animation
Animal Logic films
Animated crossover films
Annie Award winners
Best Animated Feature BAFTA winners
Best Animated Feature Broadcast Film Critics Association Award winners
Films about father–son relationships
Films about parallel universes
Films about sentient toys
Films about toys
Films adapted into television shows
Films based on toys
Films directed by Phil Lord and Christopher Miller
Films produced by Dan Lin
Films produced by Roy Lee
Films scored by Mark Mothersbaugh
Films shot in Sydney
Films with screenplays by Christopher Miller (filmmaker)
Films with screenplays by Phil Lord
Films with screenplays by The Hageman Brothers
Movie
Metafictional works
Superhero comedy films
Vertigo Entertainment films
Village Roadshow Pictures animated films
Warner Animation Group films
Warner Bros. animated films
Warner Bros. Animation animated films